Yellapragada Subba Rao (12 January 1895 – 8 August 1948) was a pioneering Indian biochemist who discovered the function of adenosine triphosphate (ATP) as an energy source in the cell, developed methotrexate for the treatment of cancer and led the department at Lederle laboratories in which Benjamin Minge Duggar discovered chlortetracycline (Aureomycin) in 1945.

A student of Madras Medical College, his elder brother and younger brother both died due to tropical sprue in the span of 8 days. He subsequently discovered folic acid as a cure for tropical sprue. He discovered methotrexate, a chemotherapy drug still used today and also used for rheumatoid arthritis, and diethylcarbamazine (DEC), the only effective drug for treating filariasis. Most of his career was spent in the United States. Despite his isolation of ATP, Subbarao did not gain tenure at Harvard though he would lead some of America's most important medical research during World War II. He is also credited with the first synthesis of the chemical compounds folic acid and methotrexate. Subbarao died in the United States due to cardiac arrest. 

Currently as an honour, after his death a street is named after him in his hometown Bhimavaram.

A contemporary of Subbarao, Cyrus H. Fiske, suppressed and destroyed many of his important works out of envy. Subbarao's colleague, George Hitchings admitted, "Some of the nucleotides isolated by Subbarao had to be rediscovered years later by other workers because Fiske, apparently out of jealousy, did not let Subbarao's contributions see the light of the day." A fungus genus has been named Subbaromyces in his honor. There is also a  species of jumping spider (Family Salticidae) from genus Tanzania named in his honor (Tanzania yellapragadai).Writing in the April 1950 issue of Argosy, Doron K. Antrim observed, "You've probably never heard of Dr. Yellapragada Subbarao. Yet because he lived, you may be alive and are well today. Because he lived, you may live longer."

Early life

Youth
He was born in Bhimavaram, Madras Presidency, now in West Godavari District, Andhra Pradesh in India to a Telugu-speaking Telugu brahmin family. He passed through a traumatic period in his schooling at Rajahmundry (due to the premature death of close relatives by disease) and eventually matriculated in his third attempt from the Hindu High School, Madras. He passed the Intermediate Examination from the Presidency College and entered the Madras Medical College where his education was supported by friends and Kasturi Suryanarayana Murthy, whose daughter he later married.

Education
Following Gandhi's call to boycott British goods he started wearing khadi surgical dress; this incurred the displeasure of M. C. Bradfield, his surgery professor. Consequently, though he did well in his written papers, he was awarded the lesser LMS certificate and not a full MBBS degree. Subbarao tried to enter the Madras Medical Service without success. He then took up a job as Lecturer in Anatomy at Dr. Lakshmipathi's Ayurvedic College at Madras. He was fascinated by the healing powers of Ayurvedic medicines and began to engage in research to put Ayurveda on a modern footing. The promise of support from Malladi Satyalingam Naicker Charities in Kakinada, and financial assistance raised by his father-in-law, enabled Subbarao to proceed to the U.S. He arrived in Boston on 26 October 1922.

Career in the United States
After earning a diploma from the Harvard Medical School he joined Harvard as a junior faculty member. With Cyrus Fiske, he developed a method for the estimation of phosphorus in body fluids and tissues called the Fiske-SubbaRao Method. He also discovered the role of phosphocreatine and adenosine triphosphate (ATP) in muscular activity, which earned him an entry into biochemistry textbooks in the 1930s. He obtained his Ph.D. degree the same year. He joined Lederle Laboratories, a division of American Cyanamid (now a division of Wyeth which is owned by Pfizer), after he failed to gain a regular faculty position at Harvard.

At Lederle, he developed a method to synthesize folic acid, Vitamin B9, based on work by Lucy Wills to isolate folic acid as a protective agent against anemia. After his work on folic acid and with considerable input from Dr. Sidney Farber, he developed the important anti-cancer drug methotrexate – one of the first cancer chemotherapy agents and still in widespread clinical use. Subbarao also discovered the basis for the anthelmintic diethylcarbamazine (Hetrazan), which was used by the World health Organization against filariasis.

Under Subbarao, Benjamin Duggar made his discovery of the world's first tetracycline antibiotic, chlortetracycline, in 1945.  Duggar identified the antibiotic as the product of an actinomycete he cultured from a soil sample collected from Sanborn Field at the University of Missouri.

References

Scientists from Andhra Pradesh
Telugu people
Madras Medical College alumni
Harvard Medical School alumni
Indian medical researchers
Indian biotechnologists
1895 births
1948 deaths
People from West Godavari district
20th-century Indian biologists
20th-century Indian chemists
Indian emigrants to the United States